The Sauvage River (in French: rivière Sauvage) is a tributary of the Gentilly River which empties on the south shore of the St. Lawrence River, in the administrative region of Centre-du-Québec, in Quebec, in Canada. The Sauvage River flows through the municipalities of Lemieux (MRC Bécancour Regional County Municipality), Saint-Louis-de-Blandford (MRC Arthabaska Regional County Municipality), Maddington Falls (MRC Arthabaska Regional County Municipality), Saint-Sylvère (MRC Bécancour Regional County Municipality), Sainte-Marie-de-Blandford (MRC Bécancour Regional County Municipality).

Geography 

The main neighboring hydrographic slopes of the Sauvage River are:
 north side: Gentilly River, Beaudet River;
 east side: rivière du Moulin, Bécancour River, Gentilly River;
 south side: Bécancour River, Saint-Sylvestre stream;
 west side: Gentilly South-West River, Bécancour River.

The Sauvage River has its source in a marsh area in the southern part of the municipality of Lemieux.

  southwest, to the intermunicipal limit of Lemieux and Maddington Falls;
  to the southwest, in Saint-Louis-de-Blandford, juxtaposing the intermunicipal boundary with Lemieux and Maddington Falls;
  north-west, in the municipality of Maddington Falls, to the municipal limit of Lemieux;
  north-west, in the municipality of Saint-Sylvère, to the route des Cyprès which constitutes the intermunicipal limit between Saint-Sylvère and Lemieux;
  north, in Lemieux, to Route de l'École;
  north-west, to the limit of Sainte-Marie-de-Blandford;
  west, in Sainte-Marie-de-Blandford, until its confluence.

The Sauvage River empties on the south bank of the Gentilly River.

Toponymy 
The toponym "rivière Sauvage" was made official on August 18, 1978, at the Commission de toponymie du Québec.

See also 

 List of rivers of Quebec

References 

Rivers of Centre-du-Québec
Bécancour Regional County Municipality
Arthabaska Regional County Municipality